Ross Ross Ross is an EP by French electronic musician SebastiAn on August 28, 2006. The release contains three songs. A compilation promotional CD of the same name was also released in 2006 and includes songs from SebastiAn's EPs Ross Ross Ross, H.A.L., and Smoking Kills, along with nine remixes that he produced.

Reception
Fred Miketa of XLR8R reviewed the CD, giving it 8/10 and saying, "You can call Ross Ross Ross fucked-up techno or chopped electro, but don't say that it isn't ahead of its time." Gareth Thorton of Glasswerk gave it another favourable review, highlighting in particular the title track: "In terms of high points it’s hard to look beyond title track Ross Ross Ross, a raucous mesh of truncated samples causing the involuntary thrusting of body parts." Lara Moloney of The Skinny gave it three out of five stars, noting, "Good tracks to listen out for are the Ross Ross Ross production and Cut Copy's Going Nowhere remix which has a more enthusiastic dance beat."

EP track listing

Promo CD track listing

References

External links 
 

2006 compilation albums
Ed Banger Records albums
Sebastian (French musician) albums